The Pentax K-3 is a 24-megapixel Pentax high-end digital single-lens reflex camera with an APS-C sensor, announced on 7 October 2013. The Pentax K-3 is the successor to both the K-5 II and K-5 IIs models, which have a 16-megapixel sensor. The K-5 II (and most other cameras of its time) had an optical low pass filter or anti-aliasing (AA) filter that can prevent the appearance of moire patterning on the captured image. This filter reduces the sharpness of the image, so Pentax also produced the K-5 IIs which omitted this filter. In the K-3, Pentax obviated the need for providing two separate models by including a selectable AA filter "simulator". This mechanism vibrates the sensor when switched on, slightly blurring the image in a way that replaces the function of the optical AA filter, providing the same benefit as the filter in the K-5 II and other cameras with an optical AA filter. When the AA simulator is disabled, the sensor records a sharper image, as in the K-5 IIs.

The Pentax K-3 was also the first camera to support the Pentax FluCard for wireless remote capture and download of images.

The Pentax K-3 is a mid-size DSLR with a weather-sealed magnesium alloy body, and is priced at a relatively similar level to the newer upper-entry level Nikon D5500 DSLR and $300 cheaper than the newer mid-range Nikon D7200 DSLR. The Pentax K-3 was ranked #2 in a comparison of mid-size DSLR class, was class-leading in image quality for portrait, street, daily and landscape photography, and ranked only slightly lower for sport photography. In-body stabilization also gives the Pentax K-3 an advantage, but its 800-gram weight is slightly more than average for a mid-size DSLR.

Limited editions
When the K-3 was originally announced, Ricoh made available a Premium Silver Edition that included the camera body and battery grip with a silver paint finish as well as an exclusive red leather neck strap. According to Ricoh, this would match the silver versions of Pentax HD DA Limited lenses. In July 2014, Ricoh announced the Prestige Edition, which included a K-3 and battery grip in a "gunmetal gray" finish as well as two batteries and black artificial leather neckstrap, embossed with the lettering "2014 TIPA BEST DIGITAL SLR EXPERT" and the Pentax K-3 logo. Each edition was limited to 2000 units.

Awards
The Pentax K-3 has won the TIPA Award "Best Digital SLR Expert" for 2014, and the EISA Photo Award 2014-2015 for Best Advanced DSLR.

References

External links 

Microsite for K-3
Product page of Pentax K-3, Pentax UK
Product page of Pentax K-3, Pentax US

Reviews
Nikon D600 vs. Pentax K-3 Image Comparison: Pentax Sweeps Nikon, Digital Camera Review
Pentax K-3 Review, Imaging Resource
Pentax K3 Camera Review, Ben Evans
Pentax K-3 Hands on Review - YouTube, Spyros Heniadis (16:29 duration)
Pentax K-3: Tests and Reviews, DxOMark

Live-preview digital cameras
K-3
Cameras introduced in 2013
Pentax K-mount cameras